Ian Lenagan (born 1946, Scholes, Wigan) is a business entrepreneur, theatre producer and shareholder of London Broncos, chairman and owner of Wigan Warriors, and former owner of Oxford United F.C. In 2016 he was appointed Chairman of the Football League.

Early life

Born in Scholes, Wigan, Lenagan attended St Patrick's Primary School as a child and gained an appreciation for rugby league, playing for the local amateur club also named St Patrick's.

He was educated at West Park Grammar School in St Helens before eventually moving onto university. Lenagan attended both Manchester and Liverpool universities and graduated with a BSc in Mathematics and a MSc in Magnetohydrodynamics respectively.

Career

Workplace Systems 
In 1985 Lenagan set up his own business, Workplace Systems, in Milton Keynes, to develop and supply software products for workforce management. Following a contract with Asda, the business became expanded across Europe, Australasia, the US and the Middle East. Major retailers known to use Workplace Systems include Argos, Focus, Sports Café, Next and Morrisons. With the success of Workplace Systems, the company was floated on the London Stock Exchange in 2000 under the name Telework Systems PLC to incorporate another company founded by Lenagan in 1981, TeleWare, which focused on the telephony software products market.

A decline in the telephone market saw TeleWare sold off to its management in 2003 and the company change its name to WorkPlace Systems International plc, 49% owned by Ian Lenagan.

In December 2011, Workplace Systems was acquired by a Lloyds Banking Group-backed management buyout, and Lenagan stepped down from his role as chairman, receiving £19m from the buyout.

Theatre producer 
Lenagan is also a successful theatre producer, with over 30 productions to his name. His most recent West End hit is a co-production of One Flew Over the Cuckoo's Nest starring Christian Slater.

Rugby league and football clubs 
Lenagan is a rugby league fan. In July 2005 he took over as chairman and majority shareholder of Harlequins RL, buying 65% of the shares and also taking a place on the board of directors. He also became a major shareholder in Oxford United, who were controlled by long-time friend Nick Merry. In July 2012 he replaced Kelvin Thomas as chairman of the League Two club. Lenagan sold his interest in Oxford United and left the board in 2016 when he was appointed Chairman of the Football League.

In 2007 it was announced after months of speculation that Lenagan would become the new owner of Wigan Warriors rugby league club, his boyhood team. Lenagan bought the club from former JJB Sports magnate and Wigan Athletic chairman Dave Whelan. Lenagan also bought the training facilities at Edge Hall Road, the former stadium of Orrell R.U.F.C. as well as a 50-year lease on the JJB Stadium. Lenagan's first signings for Wigan were George Carmont and Richie Mathers, both from the NRL, and Karl Pryce, who returned to rugby league from rugby union club Gloucester. Lenagan also signed Cameron Phelps and Tim Smith during the 2008 season.

Other businesses 
Lenagan is also the non-executive chairman and 1% owner of the Sports Café, an expanding chain of sports bars and restaurants.
Lenagan has recently started a new business called Animalates, a children's educational exercise club which is expected to be sold as a franchise.

See also

List of Super League rugby league club owners
List of owners of English football clubs
List of professional sports team owners

References

External links
 Company Profile. WorkPlace Systems plc. Accessed 8 November 2007.
 Board of Directors. WorkPlace Systems plc. Accessed 8 November 2007.

1946 births
Living people
People from Wigan
Rugby league people in England
Rugby league chairmen and investors
Sports owners
London Broncos
Wigan Warriors
English Football League
Oxford United F.C. chairmen and investors